Kristy Stratton (born 26 January 1995) is an Australian rules footballer who played for the Collingwood Football Club in the AFL Women's (AFLW).

State football
In 2014, Stratton won the Victorian Women's Football League (VWFL) Division 1 best and fairest, while playing at Knox. After rupturing her anterior cruciate ligament, she underwent a knee construction in 2015. This surgery and advice from the surgeon prompted her to give up athletics and focus on football. Stratton played for Box Hill Hawks in the VFL Women's (VFLW). In 2017, she only managed to play seven games due to tearing her lateral meniscus.

AFL Women's career
Stratton was drafted by Collingwood with the club's fifth selection and the 21st overall in the 2017 AFL Women's draft. Joining Collingwood, she teamed-up with Melissa Kuys who captained her when they played for Box Hill Hawks. She made her debut in a 14-point win over the Brisbane at Moreton Bay Central Sports Complex in round 6 of the 2018 season. Collingwood re-signed Stratton for the 2019 season during the trade period in June 2018. Midway through the season, she suffered another injury, this time breaking her hand. In April 2019, Stratton re-committed to Collingwood for the 2020 season, along with Jordyn Allen, Emma Grant, and Sharni Layton. In April 2021, Stratton was delisted by Collingwood. Following her delisting, she re-joined Box Hill Hawks.

Personal life
Stratton is the younger sister of champion athlete Brooke Stratton. Both of them attended Caulfield Grammar School in Wheelers Hill, Victoria and were active athletes, with Brooke holding many records and Kristy holding the record for 80 metres hurdles in the under-14 category. She grew up as a Collingwood supporter.

Statistics
Statistics are correct to the end of the 2021 season.

|- style="background-color: #eaeaea"
! scope="row" style="text-align:center" | 2018
|style="text-align:center;"|
| 41 || 2 || 0 || 0 || 7 || 2 || 9 || 1 || 4 || 0.0 || 0.0 || 3.5 || 1.0 || 4.5 || 0.5 || 2.0
|- 
! scope="row" style="text-align:center" | 2019
|style="text-align:center;"|
| 41 || 5 || 0 || 2 || 31 || 17 || 48 || 2 || 29 || 0.0 || 0.4 || 6.2 || 3.4 || 9.6 || 0.4 || 5.8
|- style="background-color: #eaeaea"
! scope="row" style="text-align:center" | 2020
|style="text-align:center;"|
| 41 || 1 || 0 || 0 || 2 || 3 || 5 || 0 || 1 || 0.0 || 0.0 || 2.0 || 3.0 || 5.0 || 0.0 || 1.0
|- 
! scope="row" style="text-align:center" | 2021
|style="text-align:center;"|
| 41 || 3 || 1 || 0 || 12 || 5 || 17 || 2 || 5 || 0.3 || 0.0 || 4.0 || 1.7 || 5.7 || 0.7 || 2.0
|- class="sortbottom"
! colspan=3| Career
! 11
! 1
! 2
! 52
! 27
! 79
! 5
! 40
! 0.1
! 0.2
! 4.7
! 2.5
! 7.2
! 0.5
! 3.6
|}

See also
 List of Caulfield Grammar School people

References

External links 

1995 births
Living people
People educated at Caulfield Grammar School
Collingwood Football Club (AFLW) players
Australian rules footballers from Victoria (Australia)
Sportswomen from Victoria (Australia)